Callum Hedge (born 17 November 2003) is a New Zealand racing driver who last competed in the 2021 Formula Regional European Championship season finale for G4 Racing. A multiple-time national karting champion, he won the 2017–18 NZ Formula 1600 Championship and the 2018–19 Toyota Finance 86 Championship before switching to sports car racing with Porsche in 2020.

Career

Formula Regional Oceania
In 2023, Hedge took part in the Formula Regional Oceania Championship, competing for M2 Competition. Throughout the entire season, Hedge was embroiled in the title fight with teammate Charlie Wurz, with the two trading the championship lead often as the season progressed. He won the opening race of the season at Highlands, but fell behind Wurz after finishing 13th in the feature race. Despite finishing second, first, and second in the three races at Teretonga, Wurz's pair of victories kept Hedge behind in the championship. Hedge closed the gap during the Manfeild and Hampton Downs rounds, and just six points separated the two entering the final weekend at Taupo. Hedge scored a victory in the opening race of the final weekend, but fell behind in the final two races to finish second in the championship.

Formula Regional Americas
After the Oceania championship concluded, Hedge traveled to the United States to take part in the 2023 Formula Regional Americas Championship with Crosslink Kiwi Motorsports.

Racing record

Racing career summary 

† As Hedge was a guest driver, he was ineligible to score points.
* Season still in progress.

Complete Formula Regional European Championship results 
(key) (Races in bold indicate pole position) (Races in italics indicate fastest lap)

† As Hedge was a guest driver, he was ineligible to score points.

Complete Formula Regional Oceania Championship Results
(key) (Races in bold indicate pole position) (Races in italics indicate fastest lap)

Complete Formula Regional Americas Championship Results
(key) (Races in bold indicate pole position) (Races in italics indicate fastest lap)

References

External links 
 
 

Living people
2003 births
New Zealand racing drivers
Formula Ford drivers
Formula Regional European Championship drivers
Sportspeople from Auckland
Toyota Racing Series drivers
M2 Competition drivers
Formula Regional Americas Championship drivers